National Astronomical Observatory may refer to:

 National Astronomical Observatory (Chile)
 National Astronomical Observatories of China, in Xinjiang, China
 National Astronomical Observatory (Colombia), in Bogotá
 National Astronomical Observatory of Japan, in Mitaka
 National Astronomical Observatory (Mexico), first in Mexico City; then in Tonantzintla, Puebla; now in Sierra San Pedro Mártir, Baja California 
 National Astronomical Observatory (Spain), in Madrid

See also
List of astronomical observatories